John-Allison Weiss (born April 13, 1987) is a Los Angeles-based indie pop singer, songwriter, and performer. To date, they have released three full-length albums and several EPs. Their most recent LP, New Love, was released on October 2, 2015, through SideOneDummy Records.

Biography 
John-Allison Weiss emerged at the end of the 2000s as an early crowd-funding hero with a strong D.I.Y. ethos that has defined them throughout their career. 

Weiss began playing music as a teenager in their hometown of Flowery Branch, Georgia. Inspired by the emotional tumult of young relationships, they began writing songs and released their first EP, An Eight-Song Tribute to Feeling Bad and Feeling Better, in 2007, while attending the University of Georgia in Athens, Georgia. They followed it up with a full-length concert album, Live at Sidewalk NYC, a year later.

In late 2009, Weiss turned to the newly launched Kickstarter crowd-funding platform to try raising the money for their first studio LP, ...Was Right All Along. Their campaign allowed them to reach their funding goal within the first day and triple it just days later. The Kickstarter success led to some high-exposure press, with The New York Times and Wired magazine essentially labeling them as a sort of poster child for the new era of Internet promotion. Weiss turned the attention into countless tours, interviews, and a panelist slot at the industry's SXSW conference in Austin alongside Kickstarter founder Yancey Strickler.

In 2011, Weiss recorded their second studio album, Say What You Mean, as well as a companion acoustic record called Sideways Sessions in Brooklyn, New York. Both albums were released on No Sleep Records in 2013. The label released an EP titled Remember When the following year.

In May 2015, Weiss signed with SideOneDummy Records and announced plans to release a third studio album later that year. New Love was released on October 2, 2015, produced by Forrest Kline of electro-pop band Hellogoodbye and Bradley Hale of indie rock band Now, Now.

In 2017, shortly after the release of their single "Runaway," Weiss came out as non-binary and began assuming "they/them" pronouns. They discussed the transition on the podcast Queery, hosted by comedian Cameron Esposito, for which Weiss also provides the theme music with their song "Who We Are."

Following a live album and 2021's Death Valley Demos EP, John-Allison Weiss signed with Get Better Records and issued the single "Different Now."

Associated acts
During their time in Brooklyn, New York, Weiss frequently played shows with Jenny Owen Youngs, Bess Rogers, Field Mouse, and more. They have toured with acts such as Candy Hearts, Anthony Raneri, Tim Barry, State Champs, Matt Pryor, and The Front Bottoms. They have supported artists like Laura Jane Grace, The Wonder Years, Chuck Ragan, and Relient K. In 2012, A.W. supported Lou Reed on his European tour, during which they also contributed backing vocals in Reed's band. In 2013, Daytrotter released a vinyl 12" featuring Tegan and Sara on side A and Weiss on side B. In 2015, Weiss contributed backup vocals to The Front Bottoms album Back on Top and The Wonder Years album No Closer to Heaven. Weiss has also contributed backup vocals to songs with Chris Farren, Reggie and the Full Effect, and more. A.W.'s touring band is led by musical director and guitarist Peter Recine and includes Liam McCormack of Yellowbirddd on bass and Eric Downs on drums.

Personal life

John-Allison identifies as queer, transgender, nonbinary, and gay and uses "they/them" pronouns.

Discography

Studio LPs

EPs

Other releases

Music videos
 Let Me Go (2009)
 I'm Ready (2009)
 Fingers Crossed (2010)
 Making It Up (2013)
 Wait for Me (2013)
 Golden Coast (2015)
 Who We Are (2015)

References

External links

1987 births
Living people
American LGBT musicians
People from Grosse Pointe Park, Michigan
Non-binary musicians
21st-century American singers
LGBT people from Georgia (U.S. state)
No Sleep Records artists
SideOneDummy Records artists
21st-century American LGBT people
Singer-songwriters from Michigan
American LGBT singers